Coordenação de Aperfeiçoamento de Pessoal de Nível Superior (CAPES), also known as CAPES Foundation, is a Brazilian federal government agency under the Ministry of Education, responsible for quality assurance in undergraduate and postgraduate institutions in Brazil.

The agency evaluates educational establishments every two years, and grades them according to the quality of the courses provided. Scores range from 1 to 7, where 1 is the lowest — the maximum that an institution offering up to a master's degree will gain is 5, whereas an institution offering a doctorate will gain up to A 7.

See also 
 Bachelor's degree in Brazil
 Brazilian science and technology
 CNPq
 Graduate degrees in Brazil
 Lattes Platform
 QUALIS
 Universities and higher education in Brazil
 Undergraduate education in Brazil

References

External links 
  

Higher education in Brazil
Government agencies of Brazil
Scientific organisations based in Brazil